Hagen is a lunar impact crater on the far side of the Moon. It lies to the north of the huge walled plain Planck, and south-southwest of the crater Pauli.

This is a very eroded crater with an outer rim that has been worn and broken in several places by overlapping craters. Hagen J is attached to what remains of the southeastern rim, and Hagen S crosses the rim to the west. On the interior floor, Hagen C lies just to the southeast of the midpoint. There are small craterlets along the inner edge to the south and west. The floor is pock-marked by tiny craterlets, but is otherwise relatively featureless.

Satellite craters 

By convention these features are identified on lunar maps by placing the letter on the side of the crater midpoint that is closest to Hagen.

References 

 
 
 
 
 
 
 
 
 
 
 
 

Impact craters on the Moon